William Greynton (before 1375 – after 1397) of Wells, Somerset, was an English politician.

He was a Member (MP) of the Parliament of England for Wells in September 1397.

References

Year of birth unknown
Place of birth unknown
Year of death unknown
English MPs September 1397
People from Somerset
Year of birth uncertain